Anthony Scott Johnson (born October 25, 1967) is a former professional American football running back who played eleven seasons in the National Football League for the Indianapolis Colts, the New York Jets, the Chicago Bears, the Carolina Panthers, and the Jacksonville Jaguars. Johnson now ministers as the chaplain to the Jacksonville Jaguars. He attended Stanley Clark School and then played high school football at John Adams High School. He played college football at the University of Notre Dame. Johnson was the first 1,000-yard-rusher for the Carolina Panthers with 1,120 in 1996.

References

External links
 

1967 births
Living people
American football running backs
Carolina Panthers players
Chicago Bears players
Indianapolis Colts players
Jacksonville Jaguars players
New York Jets players
Notre Dame Fighting Irish football players
Players of American football from Indianapolis